WOKQ (97.5 FM) is a radio station broadcasting a country music format for the Manchester-Nashua-Concord and Dover-Rochester-Portsmouth, New Hampshire areas.

The transmitter is located in Barrington, New Hampshire with the station's city of license being Dover, New Hampshire.  The studios are located in Dover. WOKQ also operates a simulcast on W250AB on 97.9, a translator that fills in signal holes in downtown Manchester. It brands itself as "The Big 97.5".

WOKQ is owned by Townsquare Media. At 50,000 watts of power, its broadcast signal can reach most of southern and central New Hampshire, southern Maine and northeastern Massachusetts clearly.

History
WOKQ was put on the air in August 1970 by Eastminster Broadcasting Company under the call letters WDNH.  Its country format was in place by 1972.  Eastminster sold WDNH to Fuller-Jeffrey Broadcasting in 1977, at which point it became WOKQ. Fuller-Jeffrey was sold to Citadel Broadcasting in 1999. Citadel merged with Cumulus Media on September 16, 2011.

On August 30, 2013, a deal was announced in which Townsquare Media would acquire 53 Cumulus stations, including WOKQ and WPKQ, for $238 million. The deal was part of Cumulus' acquisition of Dial Global; Townsquare and Dial Global are both controlled by Oaktree Capital Management. The sale to Townsquare was completed on November 14, 2013.

Translator
WOKQ also broadcasts on the following translator:

References

External links

OKQ
Dover, New Hampshire
Townsquare Media radio stations
Radio stations established in 1970
1970 establishments in New Hampshire
Country radio stations in the United States